2nd Corps, Second Corps, or II Corps may refer to:

France
 2nd Army Corps (France)
 II Cavalry Corps (Grande Armée), a cavalry unit of the Imperial French Army during the Napoleonic Wars
 II Corps (Grande Armée), a unit of the Imperial French army during the Napoleonic Wars

Germany
 II Cavalry Corps (German Empire), a unit of the Imperial German Army
 II Corps (German Empire), a unit of the Imperial German Army
 II Royal Bavarian Corps, a unit of the Bavarian Army and the Imperial German Army
 II Royal Bavarian Reserve Corps, a unit of the Bavarian Army and the Imperial German Army
 II SS Panzer Corps, a unit in World War II

Russian Empire
 2nd Army Corps (Russian Empire)
 2nd Siberian Army Corps
 2nd Army Corps (Armed Forces of South Russia), a unit in the white movement

Soviet Union
 2nd Airborne Corps (Soviet Union)
 2nd Rifle Corps
 2nd Guards Tank Corps

United States
 II Corps (United States), World War II
 II Corps (Union Army), a unit in the American Civil War 
 Second Corps, Army of Northern Virginia
 Second Army Corps (Spanish–American War)

Other countries
 II ANZAC Corps, Australia and New Zealand
 II Corps (Australia)
 II Canadian Corps
 Second Artillery Corps, People's Republic of China
 Finnish II Corps (Winter War)
 Finnish II Corps (Continuation War)
 II Army Corps (Greece)
 II Corps (India)
 II Corps (North Korea)
 II Corps (Ottoman Empire)
 II Corps (Pakistan)
 II Corps (Poland)
 II Corps (South Korea)
 II Corps (South Vietnam)
 II Corps (United Kingdom)
 2nd Corps (Vietnam People's Army)
 2nd Army Corps (Azerbaijan)
 2nd Army Corps (Armenia)
 2nd Army Corps of the Russian Armed Forces (formerly the Luhansk People's Republic People's Militia, of Russian separatist forces in Donbas)

See also
 List of military corps by number